Nikita Vladimirovich Podgorny (February 16, 1931 — September 26  1982) was a Soviet film and theater actor. People's Artist of the RSFSR (1971).

Biography 
Nikita Podgorny was born February 16, 1931.

He graduated from the Mikhail Schepkin Higher Theatre School (1954).

Since 1954   an actor Academic Maly Theatre. During his studies, he married his classmate Ninel Podgornaya, but a few years later divorced her.

Death

He died in Moscow on September 26 (according to other sources, 24 September) in 1982 from cancer. He was buried at the Vagankovo Cemetery (station number 38).

Selected filmography
 1958 —  The Idiot as Ganya Ivolgin
 1960 —  Michman Panin as Vedernikov
 1965 —  Volley Aurora as Alexander Kerensky
 1969 —  The Brothers Karamazov as Rakitin
 1975 —  My home — theater as Apollon Grigoryev
 1979 —  Investigation Held by ZnaToKi as Albert
 1979 —  Autumn Marathon as Georgy Nikolaevich Verigin
 1981 —  Dangerous Age as Plahin

References

External links
 

1931 births
1982 deaths
Soviet male stage actors
Soviet male film actors
Soviet male television actors
People's Artists of the RSFSR
Burials at Vagankovo Cemetery
Deaths from lung cancer
Deaths from cancer in Russia